is the 13th single by Japanese singer Hiroko Moriguchi. Written by Moriguchi, Yui Nishiwaki and Kaori Okui, the single was released on June 9, 1993 under King Records.

Background and release 
"Whistle" was Moriguchi's second collaboration with Princess Princess lead vocalist/songwriter Kaori Okui. In addition, it was the first single that Moriguchi co-wrote. The song was selected as the theme song of the 1993 edition of the Fuji TV variety show Yume ga Mori Mori. Moriguchi performed the song on the 44th Kōhaku Uta Gassen that year.

The single peaked at No. 10 on Oricon's singles chart, becoming Moriguchi's second top-10 single. She did not return to the top-10 until 2022, when "Ubugoe" also peaked at No. 10.

Track listing
All music is composed and arranged by Kaori Okui.

Chart position

References

External links 
 
 
 

1993 singles
1993 songs
Hiroko Moriguchi songs
Japanese-language songs
Songs written by Kaori Kishitani
King Records (Japan) singles